The 2022–23 Basketball Champions League Americas season is the 4th of the Basketball Champions League Americas (BCLA) season and the 16th edition of the top-tier level professional club basketball competition in the Americas. The champions qualify for the 2023 FIBA Intercontinental Cup in Singapore.

São Paulo were the defending champions, but they did not qualify for the tournament and thus were unable to defend their title.

Team allocation 
The following teams have been confirmed for the upcoming season:

Group stage 
The draw for the group stage was held on 14 October in Miami.

Group A

Group B

Group C

Group D

Quarterfinals
The quarterfinals take place in March 2023. The four winners will advance to the Final Four. Teams listed as "Team 1" will host games 2 and 3.

|}

Final 4 

On 14 March 2023, FIBA announced the Final 4 would be hosted by Franca in the Ginásio Poliesportivo Pedrocão in the Brazilian city of Franca, SP. The games will take place on 14 and 15 April 2023.

Semi-finals

Final

References

External links

Basketball Champions League Americas seasons
2022–23 in South American basketball
2022–23 in North American basketball
BCL Americas